Sokółki may refer to the following places:
Sokółki, Greater Poland Voivodeship (west-central Poland)
Sokółki, Ełk County in Warmian-Masurian Voivodeship (north Poland)
Sokółki, Olecko County in Warmian-Masurian Voivodeship (north Poland)